Igor Chebanov (born 30 July 1959) is a former Russian sport shooter who won medals at senior level at the World Championships and European Championships.

See also
Trap World Champions
Trap European Champions

References

External links
 

1959 births
Living people
Trap and double trap shooters
Russian male sport shooters
Sportspeople from Rostov-on-Don